C. lagunensis may refer to:

 Caldisphaera lagunensis, an acidilobale in the family Caldisphaeraceae
 Canna lagunensis, a garden plant
 Cicindela lagunensis, a tiger beetle